Laurel Avenue is an American three-hour television miniseries which aired on HBO on July 10 and 11, 1993. It is the story of an eventful weekend in the lives of an extended African American family living in St. Paul, Minnesota. Paul Aaron and actor Charles S. Dutton served as executive producers. The teleplay was written by Michael Henry Brown, based upon a story by Aaron and Brown. The miniseries was directed by Carl Franklin.

Cast
Mary Alice as Maggie Arnett
Jay Brooks as Uncle Otis Arnett
Juanita Jennings as Yolanda Arnett-Friedman
Scott Lawrence as Keith Arnett
Dan Martin as Woodrow Arnett
Monté Russell as Marcus Arnett
Ondrea Shalbetter as Shanequa Arnett
Rhonda Stubbins White as Rolanda Arnett
Vonte Sweet as Rushan Arnett
Gay Thomas as Kathleen Arnett
Malinda Williams as Sheila Arnett
Mel Winkler as Jake Arnett
Gary Dourdan as Anthony
Michael Tezla as Howard Friedman
Ulysses Zackery as Fletcher

Video releases
On July 10, 2001, the miniseries was released on VHS.  However, it has yet to be released on DVD or any other digital video format.

References

External links
 
 

1990s American television miniseries
HBO original programming
1993 American television series debuts
1993 American television series endings
Television shows set in Minnesota
Minnesota in fiction
Culture of Saint Paul, Minnesota
Films directed by Carl Franklin
Television series by HBO Independent Productions